Mogen David Wine Co. is a company based in Westfield, New York that makes wines, including the fortified wine MD 20/20. Mogen David Wine Co. is a trademark held by their parent company The Wine Group in Livermore, California.

Mogen David is the Yiddish pronunciation of the Hebrew Magen David, which literally means "shield of David", but is used metaphorically to refer to the six-pointed Star of David.

Products
Mogen David wine is sold in 750mL, 1.5L, and 3L bottles. It is also Kosher for Passover.

Mogen David Concord Red wine is made from must of no less than 51% Concord grapes, an American grape variety, which is typically used for grape juices, jellies, and preserves, but also used for Kosher wines. This makes the wine less expensive, averaging $5 per bottle.
In addition to Concord red, Mogen David also markets Blackberry and Pomegranate wines.

History
Founded months before the Repeal of Prohibition by Max Cohen and Henry Markus in Chicago, the California Wine Company bottled medicinal and sacramental wines, changing its name to Wine Corporation of America in 1941 when it began making wine from Concord grape juice (or concentrate) shipped from growers in New York, Pennsylvania, Ohio and later Michigan.

Chicago winery
Following World War II the company purchased a  building at 3737 South Sacramento Ave in Chicago's Brighton Park neighborhood which was converted into one of the largest wineries in the Midwestern United States. The entire winery was allocated to a single product, Mogen David, a kosher wine originally marketed for the Passover Seder that turned out to be popular year-round with the general public. Wine Corporation of America began advertising Mogen David nationally in 1947; by the early 1950s the advertising budget for Mogen David was the fourth or fifth largest for wines. Max Cohen, company President and founder, noted that 98 percent of Mogen David's customers were not Jewish.

The company launched a new line of wines under a different brand name, Key, in 1957. This marketing campaign was unsuccessful and line was dropped after three years.

In the early 1960s, concord wine was still the biggest seller in the Mogen David line, along with a rosé, a blackberry wine, a cherry wine and a dry red wine.

Company founder and chairman Max Cohen announced his resignation on 8 January 1962, citing friction with his brother-in-law, Henry A. Markus who was president of the company. Cohen sold all of his stock to Markus, saying that "I am no longer connected with the firm and I have no interest in it."

The sale of a controlling interest in Mogen David to Richard T. Schofield of Westfield, New York was announced on 9 May 1963, with Schofield taking over as president of the company and Markus appointed chairman. Some operations were moved to Westfield in 1967; Mogen David's Westfield winery was closer to the vineyards in the Northeast that grow Concord grapes for its wines, the Chicago plants remained open.

By 1968, Mogen David was producing a dozen different wines and two kinds of champagne. The company broke away from its conventional Mogen David line with the introduction of the MD 20/20 brand of flavored fortified wines that were well received by younger consumers, especially college students. The MD 20/20 line included unusual flavors such as pink grapefruit, wild berry, and Hawaiian blue.

Acquisition by Coke-New York
In 1970 the Coca-Cola Bottling Company of New York was the largest soft drink bottler in the world, having merged with the Coca-Cola Bottling Company of New Haven (acquired in 1969) but its growth prospects were limited by the franchise boundaries. When Coke-New York was approached by an investment banking firm to let them know that Mogen David was for sale, they saw an opportunity to become a major competitor in a new industry (Mogen David was the sixth largest winery and the largest Concord grape wine producer in the country) and to pick up a national sales and distribution network. Coke-New York acquired Mogen David on 1 November 1970 by paying $16,750,000 in cash. J. Myron "Mike" Bay was an officer in both companies: President of Mogen David as well as a VP of Coke-New York.

Mogen David company introduced a "pop wine" product line, Cold Bear (Concord) and Black Bear (blackberry), leading to overall growth in sales of 32 percent for 1972. Mogen David had a staff of over 45 salesmen. Mogen David wines and Tribuno vermouths were marketed nationally through over 300 independent distributors in 1972, in order to strengthen their market position, New York Coca-Cola began consolidating Tribuno and Mogen David distribution networks.

The Jug line of strawberry and apple pop wines, packaged in country-style brown and white jugs, was introduced in 1973. Mogen David had the fourth largest winery and the third largest advertising budget in the wine industry in 1973 

With its 1973 acquisitions of Tribuno Wines (previously Vermouth Industries of America) and later the well established California winery Franzia, Coke-New York was, in all, the third largest US wine producer. Franzia also shipped wine, grape concentrates and brandy in bulk to the Mogen David winery in Westfield, New York, for use in Mogen David products.

Jerome W. "Jerry" Alder joined Mogen David as President and COO in September 1976; former President Mike Bay moved into the new position of Chairman, and continued as Mogen David's CEO. In 1977, the company's administrative and marketing offices moved from the original winery at 3737 South Sacramento Ave, and into space in a new building at 444 Michigan Ave in downtown Chicago.

A study of wine marketing in 1980 found that Mogen David consumers apparently had the strongest brand loyalty in the varietal table wine category.

Acquisition by The Wine Group
Discussions between The Coca-Cola Company and The Coca-Cola Bottling Company of New York about a possible acquisition of the latter began in 1974, to little effect.

When merger discussions resumed in 1980, The Coca-Cola Company had already entered the alcoholic beverage market; their Wine Spectrum subsidiary consisting of wineries in California and New York. As part of the proposed merger, The Coca-Cola Company agreed to sell the wine business of Coke-New York to a partnership formed by First Boston and top-level managers of the New York bottler's wine business. Coke-New York divested itself of its three wineries, which were bought in 1981 by The Wine Group, a limited partnership headed by Arthur A. Ciocca, to avoid a buyout involving a third party. The Wine Group was the fifth largest wine producer nationally (just behind Coca-Cola's Wine Spectrum) for 1981 with sales of nine million cases, the same as the year before.

In 1998, 1.5 million adults were drinking Mogen David, putting it just ahead of its chief competitor Manischewitz. By 2005, Manischewitz was again dominant with more than half of kosher wine sales, Mogen David was second with 33 percent of the market.

See also
Flavored fortified wines

References

External links

Wineries in New York (state)
Kosher wine